Paul Dewey Sharp (May 11, 1952 – October 26, 2012) was an American football coach. He served as the head football coach at Southwestern Oklahoma State University from 1986 to 2004, compiling a record of 93–100–1.  Sharp led the Southwestern Oklahoma State Bulldogs to an NAIA Division I Football National Championship in 1996.

Sharp was born on May 11, 1952. A native of Douglas, Arizona, he played college football at Ouachita Baptist University in Arkadelphia, Arkansas. He died of attack on October 26, 2012.

Head coaching record

References

1952 births
2012 deaths
Central Arkansas Bears football coaches
Lamar Cardinals football coaches
Ouachita Baptist Tigers baseball players
Ouachita Baptist Tigers football coaches
Ouachita Baptist Tigers football players
Southwestern Oklahoma State Bulldogs football coaches
People from Douglas, Arizona